Cumba District is one of seven districts of the province Utcubamba in Peru.

See also 
 Hanan Wak'a

References

Districts of the Utcubamba Province
Districts of the Amazonas Region